Ventanilla (Spanish for "little window") may refer to:
 La Ventanilla, Oaxaca, a village in Santa María Tonameca, Oaxaca, Mexico
 Ventanilla District, a district of Callao, Peru
 Ventanillas de Otuzco, an archaeological site in Peru